The following is a categorically arranged list of notable singers of Sufi music.

Ghazal
Ghulam Ali
Mehdi hassan
Nusrat Fateh Ali Khan
Reshma
Jagjit Singh
Roop Kumar Rathod

Kafi
Abida Parveen
Pathanay Khan

Qawwali
Jaani Babu
sufi nizami brothers | faizan hasan zeeshan hasan nizami 
Abdullah Manzoor Niazi
Aziz Mian
Nusrat Fateh Ali Khan
Sabri Brothers
Qawwal Bahauddin Khan
Ateeq Hussain Khan
Rahat Fateh Ali Khan
Wadali Brothers
Dhruv Sangari (Bilal Chishty Sangari)
Badar Miandad
Faiz Ali Faiz
Shankar Shambhu
Amjad Sabri
Qutbi Brothers

Sufi Rock
Ali Azmat
Ali Baba Khan
Asrar
Atif Aslam
A. R. Rahman
Nusrat Fateh Ali Khan
Satinder Sartaj

Other genres of Sufi music
Toshi Sabri
Krishna Beura
Ahmed Bukhatir
Anitha Shaiq
Kailash Kher
Saieen Zahoor Ahmad
Allan Fakir
Kavita Seth
Barkat Sidhu
Hans Raj Hans
Dhruv Sangari
Mamta Joshi
Master Muhammad Ibrahim
Master Saleem
Muhammad Juman 
Muhammad Yousuf
Neerja Pandit
Reshma
Satinder Sartaaj
Shafqat Amanat Ali Khan
Shahram Nazeri
Shaukat Ali
Wadali brothers
Harshdeep Kaur
Rabbi Shergill
Madan Gopal Singh
Raja Hasan
Rubina Qureshi
Alam Lohar & Arif Lohar
Sanam Marvi
Salman Ali
Umer Hiyat

Notes and references

Performers of Sufi music
Sufi